Sleep Talking is the third Korean extended play by South Korean boy group NU'EST. It was released on August 22, 2013, by Pledis Entertainment and distributed by LOEN Entertainment.

The EP was a commercial success peaking at number 8 on the Gaon Album Chart. The EP has sold over 13,825 physical copies as of December 2013.

Background
On July 31, 2013, Ren posted a picture of himself on Twitter in the recording booth and wrote, "By. REN. Final recording! Not long till our comeback guys!!!" Then on August 5, Pledis Entertainment confirmed that Nu'est was working with Duble Sidekick for their new comeback. Finally, on August 8, Nu'est announced their comeback date as August 22, 2013 and reported that it was a mini album. Along with that, they released teaser photos of Ren and JR. They also released Baekho, Minhyun, and Aron's teaser photo later on and announced that they would be introducing a new genre of music called "mystic fantasy".

Release
On August 15, 2013, Nu'est released the intro rap video for their upcoming comeback. In the video, it had both JR and Aron in the recording booth saying their lines. On August 19, they released the teaser for their upcoming comeback Sleep Talk onto their official YouTube channel. Then on the 22nd they followed up with the release of their title song 'Sleep Talking' and announced their showcase for their new EP.

Commercial performance 
Sleep Talking entered at number 8 on the Gaon Album Chart on the chart issue dated August 18–24, 2013. In its second week, the EP fell to number 14 and to number 18 in its third week. In its fourth week, the EP placed at number 50 and at number 97 in its fifth and final week.

The EP entered at number 15 on the chart for the month of August 2013, with 11,935 physical copies sold. In September the EP placed at number 45 with 1,414 copies. The EP charted at number 100 for the year 2013, with 13,825 copies sold.

In May 2017, the EP re-entered the chart, alongside other 4 albums from the group, at number 53 with 1,610 copies.

Track listing
Digital download

Chart performance

Single chart

Album chart

Sales

Music Show charts

References

NU'EST albums
K-pop EPs
2013 EPs
Korean-language EPs
Kakao M EPs
Hybe Corporation EPs